Søren Petersen (21 June 1890 – 6 March 1971) was a Danish weightlifter. He competed in the men's light heavyweight event at the 1920 Summer Olympics.

References

External links
 

1890 births
1971 deaths
Danish male weightlifters
Olympic weightlifters of Denmark
Weightlifters at the 1920 Summer Olympics